Samir Benchenaf (born March 7, 1980) is a retired amateur Algerian Greco-Roman wrestler, who competed in the men's featherweight category. He qualified as a lone wrestler for the Algerian squad in the men's 55 kg class at the 2004 Summer Olympics in Athens, by receiving a wildcard entry from the International Federation of Associated Wrestling (FILA). He lost two straight matches each to Cuba's Lázaro Rivas (0–11) and Iran's Hassan Rangraz (0–10) due to the ten-point superiority limit, leaving him on the bottom of the pool and finishing twentieth overall in the final standings.

References

External links
 

1980 births
Living people
Algerian male sport wrestlers
Olympic wrestlers of Algeria
Wrestlers at the 2004 Summer Olympics
21st-century Algerian people
20th-century Algerian people